A gremlin is a mythological mischievous creature.

Gremlin or gremlins may also refer to:

Arts and entertainment
Gremlin (comics), a series of characters in the Marvel Universe
Gremlin Industries, an early arcade game manufacturer
 "Gremlin", a song by Danny Brown from his 2013 album Old
 "Gremlin D.Va", an artistic drawing of a character named D.Va in the video game Overwatch
Gremlins, a film released in 1984
 One of several video game versions or spin-offs of the original film:
Gremlins (Atari 2600), an action video game for the Atari VCS/2600 console
Gremlins (Atari 5200), an action video game for the Atari 5200 console
Gremlins: The Adventure, an interactive fiction computer game
Gremlins: Unleashed!, a 2001 video game for the Game Boy Advance
Gremlins: Stripe vs Gizmo, a 2002 video game for the Game Boy Advance
Gremlins 2: The New Batch, the 1990 film sequel
Gremlins 2: The New Batch (video game), a video game based on the 1990 film
Gremlins: Secrets of the Mogwai, an upcoming animated television series that serves as a prequel to the 1984 film
Gremlins, Inc., a computer game released in 2016
The Gremlins, a 1943 book by Roald Dahl

Other uses
AMC Gremlin, a subcompact car made by American Motors Corporation
Gremlin (chimpanzee), a chimpanzee featured in several documentaries
Gremlin (query language), a graph-based query language
Gremlin (protein), a naturally occurring protein
Gremlin Interactive (originally Gremlin Graphics), a British software house
Gremlin Social, a social media marketing company
SA-14 Gremlin, the NATO reporting name for the Russian 9K34 Strela-3 surface-to-air missile system
The Gremlin or Emlen Tunnell (1924–1975), American football player and coach
Dynetics X-61 Gremlins, an experimental unmanned aerial vehicle by Dynetics

See also
 Gremlina, a female professional wrestler from the Gorgeous Ladies of Wrestling